"Ghetto Story" is a dancehall/ragga single performed by dancehall artist Baby Cham. It is the first single to be released from his album of the same name. The song is most known for its reggae fusion remix called "Ghetto Story Chapter 2" featuring American R&B singer Alicia Keys. The single peaked at number 77 on the Billboard Hot 100, number 15 on Billboard's Hot R&B/Hip-Hop Singles chart, and number 13 on the Billboard Rap Tracks chart. It received heavy airplay on MTV2 and BET, and some airplay on Canada's MuchMusic. The song is about growing up in the ghetto and how it was for Cham in his younger years. The video entered BET's 106 & Park at number 9 before peaking at number 5, making it one of the very few reggae videos to reach the top 5 on that countdown. Another remix features singer Akon. Rapper Lil Wayne has freestyled over the instrumental.

Song information

These are the lyrics to the intro sung by Alicia Keys. The overall feel of the song is rage and celebration that the two have made it out of the ghetto and out of their early struggles.

The lyrics are very informative as Cham and Alicia Keys explain how it felt to live in the ghetto. Cham says A lot of people like the song for its lyrics and overall feel of the song.
These are the first two lines in Cham's opening verse:

In the official remix, which also includes singer Akon, he explains his way of living in the ghetto, and how he made it, the lines in his opening verse:

The song uses the "85" riddim.

Music video
A music video was filmed for Chapter 2 featuring Alicia Keys. It was shot in Jamaica by Sanaa Hamri. It shows the storyline of the lyrics and what it was like for Cham and Alicia Keys to live in a ghetto area. The unofficial video was put on MTV in late March. The video premiered on BET's 106 & Park on 8 August 2006 and entered the countdown three weeks later to debut at number nine and stay there for four days in a row. Eventually it peaked at number five.

Track listings
CD 1
"Ghetto Story Chapter 2" (featuring Alicia Keys) (Dameon Beckett, Dave Kelly, Alicia Keys) – 4:46
"Hood" (Dameon Beckett, Dave Kelly) – 4:30

CD 2
"Ghetto Story Chapter 2" (featuring Alicia Keys) (Dameon Beckett, Dave Kelly, Alicia Keys) – 4:46
"Ghetto Story" (album version) (Dameon Beckett, Dave Kelly) – 4:12
"Hood" (Dameon Beckett, Dave Kelly) – 7:01
"Mytone" (CD-ROM track)

Versions
"Ghetto Story Chapter 1" (Cham)
"Ghetto Story Chapter 2" (Cham featuring Alicia Keys)
"Ghetto Story Chapter 3" (Cham featuring Akon)
"Ghetto Story Chapter 4" (Cham featuring Alicia Keys and Akon)

Charts

Weekly charts

Year-end charts

References

2006 songs
Akon songs
Alicia Keys songs
Baby Cham songs
Music videos directed by Sanaa Hamri
Songs written by Alicia Keys
Songs written by Akon